Serpocaulon is a genus of ferns in the family Polypodiaceae, subfamily Polypodioideae, according to the Pteridophyte Phylogeny Group classification of 2016 (PPG I). The genus is native to Northern and Southern America.

Species 
, the Checklist of Ferns and Lycophytes of the World accepted the following species:

Serpocaulon acuminatum (Fée) Christenh.
Serpocaulon adnatum (Kunze ex Klotzsch) A.R.Sm.
Serpocaulon appressum (Copel.) A.R.Sm.
Serpocaulon articulatum (C.Presl) Schwartsb. & A.R.Sm.
Serpocaulon attenuatum (C.Presl) A.R.Sm.
Serpocaulon australe D.Sanín, J.C.Ospina, I.O.Moura & Salino
Serpocaulon caceresii (Sodiro) A.R.Sm.
Serpocaulon catharinae (Langsd. & Fisch.) A.R.Sm.
Serpocaulon chachapoyense (Hook.) A.R.Sm.
Serpocaulon concolorum (M.Kessler & A.R.Sm.) A.R.Sm.
Serpocaulon crystalloneuron (Rosenst.) A.R.Sm.
Serpocaulon dasypleuron (Kunze) A.R.Sm.
Serpocaulon dissimile (L.) A.R.Sm.
Serpocaulon eleutherophlebium (Fée) A.R.Sm.
Serpocaulon falcaria (Kunze) A.R.Sm.
Serpocaulon fraxinifolium (Jacq.) A.R.Sm.
Serpocaulon funckii (Mett.) A.R.Sm.
Serpocaulon gilliesii (C.Chr.) A.R.Sm.
Serpocaulon glandulosissimum (Brade) Labiak & J.Prado
Serpocaulon hirsutulum (T.Moore) Schwartsb. & A.R.Sm.
Serpocaulon intricatum (M.Kessler & A.R.Sm.) A.R.Sm.
Serpocaulon laetum (C.Presl) Schwartsb. & A.R.Sm.
Serpocaulon lasiopus (Klotzsch) A.R.Sm.
Serpocaulon latipes (Langsd. & L.Fisch.) A.R.Sm.
Serpocaulon latissimum (R.C.Moran & B. Øllg.) A.R.Sm.
Serpocaulon levigatum (Cav.) A.R.Sm.
Serpocaulon loriceum (L.) A.R.Sm.
Serpocaulon loriciforme (Rosenst.) A.R.Sm.
Serpocaulon × manizalense D.Sanín & Torrez
Serpocaulon maritimum (Hieron.) A.R.Sm.
Serpocaulon menisciifolium (Langsd. & Fisch.) A.R.Sm.
Serpocaulon mexiae (Copel.) A.R.Sm.
Serpocaulon nanegalense (Sodiro) A.R.Sm.
Serpocaulon obscurinervium D.Sanín
Serpocaulon panorense (C.Chr.) A.R.Sm.
Serpocaulon patentissimum (Mett. ex Kuhn) A.R.Sm.
Serpocaulon polystichum (Link) A.R.Sm.
Serpocaulon ptilorhizon (Christ) A.R.Sm.
Serpocaulon × pubescens (Rosenst.) Schwartsb. & A.R.Sm.
Serpocaulon rex Schwartsb. & A.R.Sm.
Serpocaulon richardii (Klotzsch) A.R.Sm.
Serpocaulon × rojasianum J.M.Chaves, R.C.Moran & F.Oviedo
Serpocaulon semipinnatifidum (Fée) A.R.Sm.
Serpocaulon sessilifolium (Desv.) A.R.Sm.
Serpocaulon × sessilipinnum A.Rojas & J.M.Chaves
Serpocaulon silvulae (M.Kessler & A.R.Sm.) A.R.Sm.
Serpocaulon subandinum (Sodiro) A.R.Sm.
Serpocaulon tayronae D.Sanín
Serpocaulon triseriale (Sw.) A.R.Sm.
Serpocaulon vacillans (Link) A.R.Sm.
Serpocaulon wagneri (Mett.) A.R.Sm.

References

Polypodiaceae
Fern genera